Parque Almagro is an underground metro station of Line 3 of the Santiago Metro network, in Santiago, Chile. It is an underground, between the Universidad de Chile and Matta stations on Line 3. It is located at the intersection of San Diego Avenue with Santa Isabel Avenue. The station was opened on 22 January 2019 as part of the inaugural section of the line, from Los Libertadores to Fernando Castillo Velasco.

Etymology
The station is located near the San Diego neighborhood (ex 10 de Julio) and the Almagro Park. The name of this neighborhood recalls the Battle of Huamachuco, which took place on July 10, 1883 between Chilean and Peruvian troops in the context of the Pacific War.

References

External links 
Metro de Santiago website 

Santiago Metro stations
Railway stations opened in 2019
Santiago Metro Line 3